Hannah Rainey (born 2 June 1997) is a Scottish cricketer. In July 2018, she was named in Scotland's squad for the 2018 ICC Women's World Twenty20 Qualifier tournament. She made her Women's Twenty20 International (WT20I) for Scotland against Uganda in the World Twenty20 Qualifier on 7 July 2018.

Rainey was elected as President of Edinburgh University Cricket Club in 2018. In May 2019, she was named in Scotland's squad for the 2019 ICC Women's Qualifier Europe tournament in Spain. In August 2019, she was named in Scotland's squad for the 2019 ICC Women's World Twenty20 Qualifier tournament in Scotland. In January 2022, she was named in Scotland's team for the 2022 Commonwealth Games Cricket Qualifier tournament in Malaysia.

Rainey appeared for Cumbria in the 2022 Women's Twenty20 Cup.

References

External links
 
 

1997 births
Living people
People from the London Borough of Tower Hamlets
Scottish women cricketers
Scotland women Twenty20 International cricketers
Cumbria women cricketers